The Academia Ligustica do Brenno ("Ligurian Academy of the Bran") is an Italian society founded in Genoa in 1970 with the aim of maintaining the purity of the Genoese dialect and other variants of Ligurian language. The name of the society is sometimes stylised as Académia Ligùstica do Brénno, showing the optional diacritical marks for educational purposes.

The Academia publishes an orthography of Ligurian, called grafia ofiçiâ ("official orthography"), with the aim of standardising the various ways of spelling Ligurian in a coherent and unambiguous way. It has been adopted for several books, websites, software packages, as well as for the Ligurian edition of Wikipedia. It is also used for the online dictionary hosted by the Academia.

References

Bibliography

External links 
  .
 Italian-Genoese and Genoese-Italian online dictionary .

Organisations based in Genoa
Ligurian language (Romance)
Organizations established in 1970
1970 establishments in Italy